Parapedobacter lycopersici is a Gram-negative, aerobic and rod-shaped bacterium from the genus of Parapedobacter which has been isolated from the rhizospheric soil from a tomato plant from a greenhouse from Yecheon-gun in Korea.

References

External links
Type strain of Parapedobacter lycopersici at BacDive -  the Bacterial Diversity Metadatabase

Sphingobacteriia
Bacteria described in 2017